Harvey "Duff" Kelly (24 March 1883 – 30 July 1944) was an Australian rules footballer who played with South Melbourne and Carlton in the Victorian Football League (VFL).

Western Australian Harvey Kelly played most of his games at centre half forward and was noted for his long, accurate drop and place kicks. He started out at South Melbourne in 1902 but after just one season returned home and joined East Fremantle. A member of East's 1904 premiership team, he crossed to rivals South Fremantle in 1905. His brothers Ernie and Otto, who both had VFL careers, played beside him at South Fremantle.

While in Western Australia, Kelly played two first-class cricket matches for the state, as a bowler.

Kelly went to Carlton in 1907 and participated in their premiership side that year. The following season Carlton won all of the 14 games that Kelly played in and added another premiership to their tally, with the forward kicking a goal in the Grand Final. Also in 1908 he represented Victoria at the Melbourne Carnival. He kicked a career best 28 goals in 1909 and made his third successive Grand Final, only to lose to his old club South Melbourne.

In both 1910 and 1911, Kelly played his football in Tasmania for the Lefroy Football Club. He impressed enough to represent Tasmania at the 1911 Adelaide Carnival.

He toured New Zealand in 1912, with the South Melbourne Cricket Club.

Although Carlton refused to clear him initially, he was signed up by South Melbourne as coach for the 1913 season. Under Kelly the club finished the home and away season in second position but struggled in the finals and failed to make the premiership decider. His last game in the VFL was the 1914 VFL Grand Final, which South Melbourne lost to Carlton.

See also
 1908 Melbourne Carnival
 List of Western Australia first-class cricketers

References

External links

CricketArchive: William Kelly
Australian Football.com - Harvey Kelly
Holmesby, Russell and Main, Jim (2007). The Encyclopedia of AFL Footballers. 7th ed. Melbourne: Bas Publishing.

1883 births
1944 deaths
Australian Rules footballers: place kick exponents
Carlton Football Club players
Carlton Football Club Premiership players
Sydney Swans players
Sydney Swans coaches
East Fremantle Football Club players
South Fremantle Football Club players
Lefroy Football Club players
Australian cricketers
Western Australia cricketers
South Melbourne cricketers
Cricketers from Melbourne
Australian rules footballers from Melbourne
Two-time VFL/AFL Premiership players
People from St Kilda, Victoria